was a town located in Ōmishima Island, Ochi District, Ehime Prefecture, Japan.

As of 2003, the town had an estimated population of 4,006 and a density of 92.45 persons per km². The total area was 43.33 km².

On January 16, 2005, Ōmishima, along with the towns of Hakata, Kamiura, Kikuma, Miyakubo, Namikata, Ōnishi, Tamagawa and Yoshiumi, and the villages of Asakura and Sekizen (all from Ochi District), was merged into the expanded city of Imabari and no longer exists as an independent municipality.

The island is the home of Ōyamazumi Shrine.

Climate

References

External links
Official website of Imabari in Japanese

Dissolved municipalities of Ehime Prefecture
Imabari, Ehime